Typical Cats is the self-titled debut studio album by underground hip-hop group Typical Cats. It was released on February 6, 2001, on Galapagos4.

Track listing
"Intro" - 1:19
"Reinventing the Wheel" - 4:49
"Any Day" - 3:53
"Qweloquiallisms" - 2:27
"It Won't Stop" - 3:18
"Snake Oil" - 2:18
"Natural Causes" - 1:56
"Take a Number" - 3:43
"The Manhattan Project" - 3:26
"Too Happy for Qwel" - 1:27
"Live Forever" - 4:08
"Cliché" - 3:18
"What You Thought Hops" - 4:55
"Thin Red Line" - 4:34

References

2001 albums